Kiss FM was a Finnish commercial radio station established in 1995 and owned by SBS Broadcasting Group. It was renewed and renamed to Uusi Kiss in the end of 2005 due to an announcer scandal. In 2007, it was discontinued and replaced by The Voice.

The station's target group were people between 15 and 35 years of age (formats Hot AC and CHR). It was known for its Internet chat room and prank calls.

Radio stations in Finland
Radio stations established in 1995
Radio stations disestablished in 2007
Defunct radio stations
Defunct mass media in Finland